Wasim Hasan Raja (Punjabi) (3 July 1952 – 23 August 2006) was a British Pakistani schoolteacher, match referee, cricket coach and cricketer who played in 57 Test matches and 54 One Day Internationals for the Pakistani national cricket team from 1973 to 1985.

His younger brother, Ramiz Raja, also represented Pakistan in Tests and ODIs, becoming captain of the national side. Another brother, Zaeem Raja, also played first-class cricket, as did his father, Saleem Akhtar.

Early and personal life 
Wasim Raja was born in Multan in the Punjab. His father was a high-ranking civil servant. Raja obtained a master's degree in political science from Government College, Lahore. He was captain of the Pakistan Under-19 side.

He settled in London after marrying an Englishwoman, Ann. He studied for a certificate in education from Durham University, and he had a spell teaching geography, mathematics and physical education at Caterham School in Surrey. He was also a coach for the Pakistan Under-19 team, and he was an International Cricket Council match referee in 15 Tests and 34 ODIs from 2002 to 2004.

He died of a heart attack in Marlow, Buckinghamshire, England, in August 2006 while playing cricket for the Surrey over-50s side. He is survived by his wife and his sons, Ali and Ahmad.

Career 
During his playing career, Raja was known primarily as a dashing middle-order left-handed batsman, with a characteristically generous backlift and breathtaking stokeplay combining a keen eye with wristy execution. Raja also bowled flat wrist spin with his right hand that was good enough to take 51 wickets in Tests, with his scalps including Clive Lloyd, Roy Fredericks, Glenn Turner and Viv Richards. In all, he played in 250 first-class matches, scoring 11,434 runs at an average of 35.18, including 17 centuries, and taking 558 wickets at an average of 29.05.

His finest hour in Test cricket was the tour to the West Indies in 1976–77, when he topped the Pakistani batting averages with 517 runs at 57.4 and came second in the bowling averages with 7 wickets at 18.7, behind Majid Khan. He also scored 14 sixes in the Test series, setting a record that has been equalled 4 times but still remains the only instance away from home. He top-scored in both innings of the drawn 1st Test in Barbados, to push West Indies to within one wicket of their first loss at Kensington Oval since 1935. In their second innings, Pakistan were reduced to 158–9 by Andy Roberts and Colin Croft, a lead of only 144 just over halfway through the fourth day, but a last-wicket stand of 133 with Wasim Bari set the West Indies a target of 306. At the close of the fifth day, West Indies were 55 runs adrift, on 251–9. West Indies won their next 12 matches at Bridgetown, until they were finally beaten by England in the 4th Test in 1994. He was a cricket teacher at Haslemere Preparatory School from 2004 to 2006. There is a memorial plaque there in his honour. He is also remembered in the northeast of England, playing for Durham CCC, before the county was awarded first-class status.

Book 
With Adam Licudi, Cornered Tigers: History of Pakistan’s Test Cricket from Abdul Kardar to Wasim Akram, 1997, 300 p.

See also
 List of fatalities while playing cricket

References

See also
 
 Wasim Raja – A breathtaking strokeplayer, Cricinfo, 23 August 2005
 Only the good die young, Cricinfo, 23 August 2006
Wasim Raja dies playing cricket, Cricinfo, 23 August 2006
Obituary, The Daily Telegraph, 24 August 2006
Obituary, The Times, 24 August 2006
Obituary, The Guardian, 25 August 2006

Pakistan Test cricketers
Pakistan One Day International cricketers
Cricketers at the 1975 Cricket World Cup
Cricketers at the 1979 Cricket World Cup
Cricketers at the 1983 Cricket World Cup
Pakistani cricketers
Lahore cricketers
Sargodha cricketers
National Bank of Pakistan cricketers
Durham cricketers
Northumberland cricketers
Alumni of Durham University
Cricket match referees
1952 births
2006 deaths
Cricketers from Multan
Pakistan International Airlines A cricketers
Lahore Greens cricketers
Punjab University cricketers
Lahore A cricketers
Pakistan Universities cricketers
Lahore City Blues cricketers
Lahore City Whites cricketers
Central Zone (Pakistan) cricketers
Cricket deaths
Government College University, Lahore alumni
St. Anthony's High School, Lahore alumni
Pakistani emigrants to the United Kingdom
Naturalised citizens of the United Kingdom
Schoolteachers from Surrey
Pakistani cricket coaches
British people of Punjabi descent
D. B. Close's XI cricketers